María Vanesa Ortega Godoy is a Paralympic former athlete from Spain competing mainly in category T11 sprint events. She was a Paralympic silver medalist.

Biography

Ortega was born with congenital cataracts as a result of her mother contracting rubella during pregnancy. 

María's sporting career began in January 1994 when her parents took her to Seville to Louis Braille Education Resource Centre she met her first coach Florencio Morcillo, he trained her for less than a month and she competed at her first ever track and field competition for the blind and visually impaired in Torremolinos, she then successfully qualified for the IBSA European Championships in London. She conquered the championships and won four golds in sprinting events and the long jump. She became a national champion in the 400m and 800m a year later, she was selected once more to compete at the IBSA European Championships in Valencia but she couldn't because she had eye surgery.

She competed as part of the Spanish Paralympic athletics team at the 1996 Summer Paralympics in Atlanta following her two consecutive wins at the Spanish national championships, she was one of the youngest competitors of the Spanish delegation just aged fifteen. She finished second in her 200m heat behind Germany's Claire Brunotte who set a world record only to lose it in the final and then finished second behind Russia's Rima Batalova in the 400m final earning her the silver medal. After Ortega won her Paralympic silver medal, she went on to compete at the IBSA World Games in 1998 in Madrid where she won two more medals, followed by two gold medals at the 1998 World Junior Championships in Prague in 400m and shot put. She also participated at the 2001 IAAF World Championships in the 100m T12 demonstration event.

References

External links
 
 

1981 births
Living people
Sportspeople from Málaga
Paralympic athletes of Spain
Paralympic silver medalists for Spain
Paralympic athletes with a vision impairment
Paralympic medalists in athletics (track and field)
Athletes (track and field) at the 1996 Summer Paralympics
Athletes (track and field) at the 2000 Summer Paralympics
Medalists at the 1996 Summer Paralympics
Spanish female sprinters
Visually impaired sprinters
Paralympic sprinters
Spanish blind people